Anthony Joseph "Tony" De Domenico, OAM (born 29 December 1950) is an Australian politician and was a member of the Australian Capital Territory Legislative Assembly elected to the multi-member single constituency Assembly and later elected to represent the multi-member electorate of Brindabella for the Liberal Party. De Domenico was initially elected the second ACT Legislative Assembly in 1992, and elected to represent Brindabella in the Assembly in 1995 general election. De Domenico resigned from the Assembly on 30 January 1997 to take up a position in the private sector and, during his parliamentary career, served as Deputy Chief Minister of the Australian Capital Territory, Minister for Industrial Relations, Minister for Urban Services and Deputy Leader of the Opposition.

Between 2000 and 2003, De Domenico was based in Milan, Italy, as a trade commissioner; and since 2004, has been Executive Director of the Victorian Division of the Urban Development Institute of Australia. Prior to his election, De Domenico was President of the Canberra Chamber of Commerce.

References

Deputy Chief Ministers of the Australian Capital Territory
Liberal Party of Australia members of the Australian Capital Territory Legislative Assembly
Members of the Australian Capital Territory Legislative Assembly
1950 births
Living people